Eddie J. Johnson (February 3, 1959 – January 21, 2003) was an American football linebacker who played ten seasons in the National Football League with the Cleveland Browns. He wore number 51 during his time with the Browns and his nickname was "The Assassin". He was known for his fierce tackling style.  He died in 2003 after a two-year battle with colon cancer.

References

1959 births
2003 deaths
20th-century African-American sportspeople
21st-century African-American people
African-American players of American football
American football linebackers
Cleveland Browns players
Deaths from cancer in Ohio
Deaths from colorectal cancer
Louisville Cardinals football players
Players of American football from Georgia (U.S. state)
Sportspeople from Albany, Georgia
Ed Block Courage Award recipients